"Seeti Maar" is an Indian Telugu-language song composed by Devi Sri Prasad for the soundtrack album of the film DJ: Duvvada Jagannadham. The song features Allu Arjun and Pooja Hegde with vocals by Jaspreet Jasz and Rita Thyagarajan and lyrics by Balaji. The song was released on 22 August 2017 under the music label Aditya Music.

Release 
The promo of the song was unveiled on 21 June, and after it received positive reception, the full video song was released as a music video on 22 August 2017.

Music video 
The music video features Allu Arjun and Pooja Hegde dancing for the single. Sekhar had choreographed the dance in the music video.

Reception

Audience response 
As of April 2021, the song has crossed over 200 million views on YouTube.

Critical reception 
123Telugu stated that "Seeti Maar is a peppy dance number which has especially been composed keeping Bunny’s dancing capability in mind. The orchestration is very upbeat and Jaspreet Jazz brings a very western touch to this song with his voice."

Other versions 
The song was later released as a single in Malayalam with same name sung by Vipin Xavior and Ranjini Jose for the film's Malayalam version. The song is re-composed and re-mixed by Devi Sri Prasad for the soundtrack of 2021 Hindi film Radhe with lyrics by Shabbir Ahmed and sung by Kamaal Khan and Iulia Vantur.

Music credits
Credits adapted from Aditya Music.

 Devi Sri Prasad – composer, producer
 Jaspreet Jasz, Rita – singers
 Balaji – lyrics
 Vikas Badisa – keyboards
 Kalyan – additional keyboard, rhythm
 Chota K Prasad – editor
 Sekhar – choreography

Notes

References 

2017 songs
Telugu film songs
Songs written for films
Indian songs
Songs with music by Devi Sri Prasad
Songs from DJ: Duvvada Jagannadham
Dance-pop songs
Filmi songs